The French Baroque composer Jean-Philippe Rameau wrote three books of  for the harpsichord. The first, was published in 1706; the second, in 1724; and the third, in 1726 or 1727. An isolated piece, "", survives from 1747.

Premier Livre de Pièces de Clavecin (1706)

Suite in A minor, RCT 1
 Prélude
 Allemande I
 Allemande II
 Courante
 Gigue
 Sarabandes I – Sarabande II
 Vénitienne
 Gavotte
 Menuet
c. 22 mins

Pièces de  (1724)

Suite in E minor, RCT 2
Allemande
Courante
Gigue en Rondeau I
Gigue en Rondeau II
Le Rappel des Oiseaux
Rigaudon I – Rigaudon II et Double
Musette en rondeau. Tendrement
Tambourin
La Villageoise. Rondeau
c. 22 mins

Suite in D major, RCT 3
Les Tendres Plaintes. Rondeau
Les Niais de Sologne – Premier Double des Niais – Deuxième Double des Niais
Les Soupirs. Tendrement
La Joyeuse. Rondeau
La Follette. Rondeau
L'Entretien des Muses
Les Tourbillons. Rondeau
Les Cyclopes. Rondeau
Le Lardon. Menuet
La Boiteuse
c. 30 mins

Menuet en Rondeau in C major, RCT 4
c. 1 minute

Nouvelles Suites de Pièces de Clavecin (1726–1727)

Publication history
The exact date of publication, at Rameau's own expense, of the Nouvelles Suites de Pièces de Clavecin remains a matter of some controversy. In his 1958 edition of the works, the editor Erwin Jacobi gave 1728 as the original publication date. Kenneth Gilbert, in his 1979 edition, followed suit. Others later argued that these works did not appear until 1729 or 1730. However, a recent reexamination of the publication date, based on the residence Rameau provided in the frontispiece (Rue des deux boules aux Trois Rois), suggests an earlier date, since Rameau's residence had changed by 1728. As a result of this and other evidence, the closest approximation for the original publication date stands between February 1726 and the summer of 1727. This dating is given further authentication by the comments of Friedrich Wilhelm Marpurg, who provided their publication date as 1726. There are almost 40 extant copies of the original 1726/27 edition.

Two later editions followed both around 1760. The first (printed perhaps slightly before 1760) was simply a reimpression of the original engravings, although several plates were reengravings, suggesting that the original plates had undergone sufficient impression to wear them down to a state of illegibility. A second appeared in London under the title A Collection of Lessons for the harpsichord from the printer John Walsh which was based on the earlier Parisian edition.

Suite in A minor, RCT 5

Allemande
Courante
Sarabande
Les Trois Mains
Fanfarinette
La Triomphante
Gavotte et six doubles
c. 33 mins

Suite in G major/G minor, RCT 6
Les Tricotets. Rondeau
L'indifférente
Menuet I – Menuet II
La Poule
Les Triolets
Les Sauvages
L'Enharmonique. Gracieusement.
L'Égyptienne
c. 23 mins

References

Further reading
 Cuthbert Girdlestone Jean-Philippe Rameau: His Life and Work (Dover paperback edition, 1969)
The New Grove French Baroque Masters ed. Graham Sadler (Grove/Macmillan, 1988)
Lengths of pieces are taken from recordings by Trevor Pinnock.

External links

Compositions for harpsichord
Compositions by Jean-Philippe Rameau
1706 books
1706 compositions
1724 books
1724 compositions
1727 books
1727 compositions